Lurine Lilian Cato,   British gospel singer, songwriter and session vocalist, won the MOBO Award for Best Gospel Act in 2013 and was nominated in the same category in 2017. She was a finalist on the 12th Season of Britain's Got Talent 2018 with the B Positive Choir. She has a 5-octave vocal range.

Early life 
Cato began her musical career at the age of 3 at the COGIC UK National Convention.  She sang in the Sunshine Band which taught her how to sing in harmony and developed her solo singing skills.  She is 9th of 11 siblings and considers her mother and sisters to be her first musical influences. Her eldest sister was instrumental in getting her into her to record her first jingle on radio.  At the age of 8 she entered the Enfield Borough Talent Competition with a song by Denise Williams called "Let's Hear It For The Boy" which resulted in her gaining second place in the competition.  Not wanting her to give up, her sister encouraged her to enter the following year where she sang "Greatest Love of All" by George Benson. Her performance of the song made popular by Whitney Houston won her first place, and she was awarded the Aunty G cup. In her mid-twenties, she toured with the Lighthouse Family and the late Lynden David Hall.  Later, she met Marie Carter and formed a group with two other female singers who called themselves Redeemed.  There were multiple incarnations of the group until it finally became a duet with Cato and Carter. They went on to open concerts for Hezekiah Walker at Faith Chapel in Peckham and Kirk Franklin at the Royal Festival Hall in London and the Symphony Hall in Birmingham.  .  . Cato and Carter also sang with the Bibleway Mass Choir.

Career, notable performances and achievements 
As a backing singer, she toured with Kylie Minogue in 2001 on her On A Night Like This tour and appeared in Kylie Minogue: Kylie Fever 2002 in Concert – Live in Manchester (2002) Cato also recorded vocals for Adele's debut album '19 in 2008 on Best For Last. She has also provided vocals for other noted artists such as Sigma, Union J on songs like You Got It All,  Hozier on his Nina Cried Power EP, Rebecca Ferguson on Freedom, and Elton John's Rocket Man (Music From The Motion Picture).

In December 2016 Cato performed for a carol concert at the Old Royal Naval College Chapel in aid of the Demelza Hospice Care for Children Earlier that year she also performed for the MVISA Awards alongside other artists such as Chyna Whyne, Zara Zykes and Wayne Marshall

As well as her MOBO Award and nomination, Cato has won other music awards including the Premier Gospel Award (Best Female Artist) in 2016 and 2017, GMA, Italy, (Best International Vocalist of the Year), BEFFTA Award 2013 (Best Gospel Act), Wise Woman Award 2012 (WWA Woman In Music Award), and an Honorary UK Entertainment Award 2017 (Outstanding Contribution to Gospel Music) Cato had the esteemed privilege to perform at the 2012 London Olympics for the Evening of Olympians celebration.

Lurine was a featured artist at the first annual European True Worship Summit a gospel conference held over a three-day period at the Dominion Centre in Wood Green.  Other notable gospel artists included Reverend Bazil Meade MBE, founder of the London Community Gospel Choir and Noel Robinson.  International guests included Londa Lamond, Israel Houghton, Kim Burrell, Donald Lawrence and Kirk Franklin.  The event culminated in a final concert where the B Positive Choir performed with Cato.

Cato was recently invited by Sadiq Khan Mayor of London to sing at his campaign dinner held at the Museum of London and appointed as the official Vocal Coach for ITV's Sing It To Win It Competition 2018.  The competition presenters include former Girl's Aloud band member Kimberly Walsh and UK-based Afropop and Dancehall duo Reggie 'n' Bollie

Cato and the B Positive Choir recently appeared on The One Show on the BBC continuing their campaign to raise awareness of sickle cell and blood donation. Cato and the B Positive Choir are contestants on the Britain's Got Talent 2018 competition.  They decided to audition for the competition in a bid to bring awareness of the campaign to a wider audience.  After a successful audition on 14 April 2018 on ITV they received a 'yes' vote from all 4 judges namely Simon Cowell, Amanda Holden, Alesha Dixon and David Walliams.  Amanda Holden specifically had a deep connection with the choir as blood donors saved her life and remarked that the National Health Service had an incredible impact on her life and her family. Although a powerful semi-final performance, the judges combined with a public vote ultimately sent Calum Courtney through to the finals.  A tough decision between Calum and the B Positive choir moved Simon Cowell to do his best to get B Positive a wild card.  After a week of performances, the wild card recipient was reported in OK Magazine sending B Positive to the finals of Britain's Got Talent.  With only two days to prepare Cato and the B Positive Choir reprised their audition song to a cheering and supportive audience to which Simon Cowell also remarked that "it was the best performance so far that night."  Though making it through to the finals they did not make it to the top three, namely Lost Voice Guy, Robert White and Donchez Dacres with Lost Voice Guy taking first place through a public vote.

Cato has been involved with the NHS 70th Celebrations performing at York Minster Cathedral.  Lurine was the featured soloist with the B Positive choir at Westminster Abbey a service of celebration for Common Wealth Day.  Other performers included the Dhol Foundation drummers, Clean Bandit, William Barton and Alfie Boe.

On 6 March 2020, she was awarded the International Women's Day Award by the Mayor of Enfield along with Her Excellency Justina Mutale and Team GB sprinter and Olympics medal winner Desiree Henry. On the 20 October 2019 Lurine performed at Rudolph Walker's OBE 80th birthday celebrations at the Hackney Empire.  On 17 and 24 November 2019 BBC1 aired its semi-final and final rounds of Songs of Praise' Gospel Choir of the Year where Lurine made a special guest appearance She was appointed Member of the Order of the British Empire (MBE) in the 2020 Birthday Honours for services to charity and music. The Gazette – Official Public Record On November 6, 2021 Lurine was the surprise guest of a star-studded guest line up to celebrate and honor unsung heroes within the community and business sector.  Honorees for the Multicultural Business & Community Champion (MBCC) awards included Kanya King, Ashley Cain and Safiyya Vorajee, campaigner Stuart Lawrence, Claire Goodwin-Fee, Liz Pemberton and Casey Bailey.  Other attendees include Jamelia and Lemar On 14 December 2021 Lurine attended her investiture at Windsor Castle to be presented with the MBE award for services to charity and music, the award was presented by Princess Anne

Charitable work 
Cato is very active in charity work with The Children's Society, which aims to reduce world child poverty.

In 2016 she was invited as a special guest to perform at the St. James Palace for the Diana Award as part of the INSPIRE series which awards young people for improving the lives of other people and their communities Her performance was well received, and she was invited to perform at a private function at Althorp House, the home of Earl Spencer (brother of Diana, Princess of Wales).

She made her debut MOBO Awards TV performance with the B Positive Choir live at the prestigious First Direct Arena in Leeds November 2017. Subsequently, in December 2017, the B-Positive choir released a charity single called Rise Up, which was originally sung by Andra Day, but with Cato as lead to help raise awareness of the need for new donors and highlight the ongoing need to give blood to help people with sickle cell. Later that month Cato performed at the St. Pancras station with the B Positive choir singing a mixed repertoire of Christmas songs to a captive audience

On 11 June 2019, Lurine and the B Positive Choir performed at the Audi Sentebale Concert at Hampton Court Palace along with other guest artists such as Rita Ora, Morena Leraba and the Inala Zulu Ballet.  Also, in attendance was Prince Harry in support of the Sentebale, the charity he founded which supports children affected by HIV in South Africa.

Community work 
Cato sang at One Minute in May, a concert focusing on young victims of violent crime held outside Downing Street.  Cato recently presented and performed at HMP Elmley for the Aspire Higher" Violence Reduction" Programme, which aims to focus on personal development, self-reflection, breaking bad habits, positive thinking, motivation and inspiration of the prisoners and staff.

The Mighty Men Experience is an initiative Cato created to highlight the positive male role models in our community and unite men in tackling knife and gun crime.  She wrote a single called Keep Fighting which became the official song for the project.

In April 2020 Lurine and a number of notable British artists came together to record the popular hymn Great Is Thy Faithfulness on YouTube to bring a sense of hope and inspiration to the people of Great Britain and wider global community who have been impacted by the COVID-19 pandemic.

Lurine again teamed up with a group of singers from the UK and abroad to record Amazing Grace by Dottie Rambo in aid of the Cavall Nurses' Trust .  Healthcare staff have been placed under severe pressure while dealing with the COVID-19 pandemic which has placed the NHS under incredible strain.  The effort led by Lurine will seek to raise funds for NHS nurses who may be experiencing difficulties.

Discography

Awards and nominations

References

External links 
 Lurine Cato Official Website

Living people
1974 births
21st-century Black British women singers
English soul singers
Singers from London
Members of the Order of the British Empire
English women singer-songwriters
British Christians
British record producers
British gospel singers